Eastman is a surname. Notable people with the surname include:
Brian Max Eastman (1986-2020), American Artist
A. Theodore Eastman, American bishop
Allan Eastman (1912–1987), Australian diplomat
Annis Bertha Ford Eastman (1852-1910), American Congregationalist minister
Arthur Macarthur Eastman (1810-1877), American industrialist
Carole Eastman (1934–2004), American screenwriter
Charles Eastman (1858–1939), Native American physician, writer, national lecturer and reformer
Charles S. Eastman (1864-1939) American lawyer and politician
Creswell Eastman (b.1940) Australian Endocrinologist, professor of medicine, known for Iodine Deficiency Disorders research.
Crystal Eastman (1881–1928) American lawyer, anti-militarist, feminist, socialist and journalist
David Eastman, (b. 1945) Australian convicted murderer
David Eastman (politician)
Edward Eastman, American politician
George Eastman (1854–1932), American inventor and philanthropist, founder of Kodak
George Eastman (actor) (b. 1942), Italian actor
Howard Eastman (b. 1970), middleweight boxer
John A. Eastman, Wisconsin politician
John C. Eastman (b. 1960), American lawyer, law professor and politician
John H. Eastman (1861–1938), Louisiana politician
Joseph Bartlett Eastman (1882–1944), American government official in various capacities
Julius Eastman (1940–1990), African-American composer, pianist, vocalist and dancer
Kevin Eastman (b. 1962), co-creator of the Teenage Mutant Ninja Turtles series
Kevin Eastman (basketball) (born 1955), American basketball player and coach, currently assistant to Los Angeles Clippers head coach Doc Rivers
Lee Eastman (1910–1991), American attorney and art collector
Leroy D. Eastman (1872-1945), American politician
Linda McCartney née Eastman (1941–1998), American photographer, musician and animal rights activist, wife of Paul McCartney, daughter of Lee Eastman
Linda Eastman (1867–1963), American librarian
Marilyn Eastman (1933–2021), American actress
Marvin Eastman (b. 1971), American mixed martial artist and kickboxer

Mary F. Eastman (?-?), American educator, lecturer, writer, suffragist
Mary H. Eastman (1818–1887), born Mary Henderson; American writer on Native American life; wife of Seth 
Max Eastman (1883–1969), American writer, poet and political activist
Monk Eastman (1875–1920), New York gangster
P. D. Eastman (1909–1986), cartoonist and author of children's books
Peter Eastman (disambiguation)
Rebecca Lane Hooper Eastman (1877–1937), American writer
Rodney Eastman (b. 1967), Canadian actor
Seth Eastman (1808–1875), US Army officer, mapmaker and illustrator; husband of Mary H.
Seth and Mary Eastman (1808–1875 and 1818–1887), recorders of Native American life
W. Dean Eastman (b. 1948), American educator